
Cisticolas (pronounced sis-TIC-olas) are a genus of very small insectivorous birds formerly classified in the Old World warbler family Sylviidae, but now usually considered to be in the separate family Cisticolidae, along with other southern warbler genera. They are believed to be quite closely related to the swallows and martins, the bulbuls and the white-eyes. The genus contains about 50 species, of which only two are not found in Africa: one in Madagascar and the other from Asia to Australasia.  They are also sometimes called fantail-warblers due to their habit of conspicuously flicking their tails, or tailor-birds because of their nests.

The genus was erected by the German naturalist Johann Jakob Kaup in 1829. The name Cisticola is from Ancient Greek kisthos, "rock-rose", and Latin colere, "to dwell".

Range and habitat
Cisticolas are widespread through the Old World's tropical and sub-tropical regions. Africa, which is home to almost all species, is the most likely ancestral home of the group. Cisticolas are usually non-migratory with most species attached to and often distinguishable by their habitats.

A variety of open habitats are occupied. These include wetlands, moist or drier grasslands, open or rocky mountain slopes, and human-modified habitats such as road verges, cultivation, weedy areas or pasture. The species preferring wetlands can be found at the edges of mangrove, or in papyrus, common reed, or typha swamps. Cisticolas are generally quite common within what remains of their preferred habitats.

The zitting cisticola (or fan-tailed warbler) is widespread throughout the tropics and even breeds in southern Europe. It has occurred on a few occasions as a vagrant to England.

Description

Because of their small size (about 10 cm) and brown plumage, they are more easily heard than seen. The similar plumage of many species can make them hard to identify, particularly in winter when they seldom emerge from their grasses. Many African species, in particular, are difficult to distinguish other than by their calls.  Thirteen species are named for their calls, from "singing" and "chirping" to "bubbling" and "siffling".

Behaviour
Male cisticolas are polygamous. The female builds a discreet nest deep in the grasses, often binding living leaves into the soft fabric of felted plant down, cobweb, and grass: a cup shape for the zitting cisticola with a canopy of tied-together leaves or grasses overhead for camouflage, a full dome for the golden-headed cisticola. The average clutch is about 4 eggs, which take about 2 weeks to hatch. The parasitic weaver is a specialist parasite of cisticolas and prinias.

In summer, male cisticolas of smaller species make spectacular display flights while larger species perch in prominent places to sing lustily. Despite his size and well-camouflaged, brown-streaked plumage, the male golden-headed cisticola of Australia and southern Asia produces a small, brilliant splash of golden-yellow colour in the dappled sunlight of a reed bed.

List of species
The genus contains 53 species:
 Red-faced cisticola, Cisticola erythrops
 Singing cisticola, Cisticola cantans
 Whistling cisticola, Cisticola lateralis
 Trilling cisticola, Cisticola woosnami
 Chattering cisticola, Cisticola anonymus
 Bubbling cisticola, Cisticola bulliens
 Hunter's cisticola, Cisticola hunteri
 Chubb's cisticola, Cisticola chubbi
 Kilombero cisticola, Cisticola bakerorum
 Black-lored cisticola, Cisticola nigriloris
 Lazy cisticola, Cisticola aberrans
 Rock-loving cisticola, Cisticola emini
 Rattling cisticola, Cisticola chiniana
 Boran cisticola, Cisticola bodessa
 Churring cisticola, Cisticola njombe
 Ashy cisticola, Cisticola cinereolus
 Tana River cisticola, Cisticola restrictus
 Tinkling cisticola, Cisticola rufilatus
 Grey-backed cisticola, Cisticola subruficapilla
 Wailing cisticola, Cisticola lais
 Lynes's cisticola, Cisticola distinctus (sometimes considered as a subspecies of the wailing cistocola) 
 Rufous-winged cisticola, Cisticola galactotes
 Winding cisticola, Cisticola marginatus
 Coastal cisticola, Cisticola haematocephalus
 White-tailed cisticola, Cisticola anderseni
 Ethiopian cisticola, Cisticola lugubris
 Luapula cisticola, Cisticola luapula
 Chirping cisticola, Cisticola pipiens
 Carruthers's cisticola, Cisticola carruthersi
 Levaillant's cisticola, Cisticola tinniens
 Stout cisticola, Cisticola robustus
 Aberdare cisticola, Cisticola aberdare
 Croaking cisticola, Cisticola natalensis
 Red-pate cisticola, Cisticola ruficeps
 Dorst's cisticola, Cisticola guinea - formerly C. dorsti or included in C. ruficeps
 Tiny cisticola, Cisticola nana
 Short-winged cisticola, Cisticola brachypterus
 Rufous cisticola, Cisticola rufus
 Foxy cisticola, Cisticola troglodytes
 Neddicky, Cisticola fulvicapilla
 Long-tailed cisticola, Cisticola angustacauda
 Black-tailed cisticola, Cisticola melanurus
 Zitting cisticola, Cisticola juncidis
 Socotra cisticola, Cisticola haesitatus
 Madagascar cisticola, Cisticola cherina
 Desert cisticola, Cisticola aridulus
 Cloud cisticola, Cisticola textrix
 Black-backed cisticola, Cisticola eximius
 Dambo cisticola, Cisticola dambo
 Pectoral-patch cisticola, Cisticola brunnescens
 Pale-crowned cisticola, Cisticola cinnamomeus
 Wing-snapping cisticola, Cisticola ayresii
 Golden-headed cisticola, Cisticola exilis

References

Further reading
 Nguembock B.; Fjeldsa J.; Tillier A.; Pasquet E. (2007): A phylogeny for the Cisticolidae (Aves: Passeriformes) based on nuclear and mitochondrial DNA sequence data, and a re-interpretation of a unique nest-building specialization. Molecular Phylogenetics and Evolution 42: 272–286.
Ryan, Peter (2006). Family Cisticolidae (Cisticolas and allies). Pp. 378–492 in del Hoyo J., Elliott A. & Christie D.A. (2006) Handbook of the Birds of the World. Volume 11. Old World Flycatchers to Old World Warblers'' Lynx Edicions, Barcelona

External links
Cisticola videos on the Internet Bird Collection

 
Cisticolidae
Bird genera